Dion and the Belmonts were an American vocal trio prominent throughout the 1950s. All of its members were from the Bronx, New York City. In 1957, Dion DiMucci joined the vocal group the Belmonts. The established trio of Angelo D'Aleo, Carlo Mastrangelo and Fred Milano formed a quartet with DiMucci.

Dion and the Belmonts released four studio albums and one live album, with multiple Billboard Hot 100 songs. The Belmonts have yet to be inducted into the Rock and Roll Hall of Fame, even though Dion was in 1989. In 2000, the group was inducted into the Vocal Group Hall of Fame.

Background and history 
The name the Belmonts was derived from two of the four singers having lived on Belmont Avenue in the Bronx; the other two lived near Belmont Avenue.

After unsuccessful singles on Mohawk Records in 1957, and then on Jubilee Records (including "The Chosen Few" by Dion & the Timberlanes, not the Belmonts), Dion was paired with the Belmonts. The group signed with Laurie Records in early 1958. The breakthrough came when their first Laurie release, "I Wonder Why", reached No. 22 on the Billboard Hot 100 chart, and they appeared for the first time on the nationally televised American Bandstand show, hosted by Dick Clark.  Dion said of the Belmonts:  Dion and the Belmonts were the sound of the city.  Their roots were doo-wop groups like the Flamingos, the Five Satins and the Dells, acts who developed their sound in urban settings on street corners, mimicking instruments with their voices and even complex jazz arrangements.

They followed the hit with the ballads "No One Knows" (No. 19) and "Don't Pity Me" (No. 40), which they also performed on Bandstand. This early success brought them their first major tour in late 1958, with the Coasters, Buddy Holly and Bobby Darin, followed by the historic and tragic Winter Dance Party tour featuring Holly, Ritchie Valens and the Big Bopper. On February 2, 1959, after playing the Surf Ballroom, Holly arranged to charter a plane. Dion decided he could not afford the $36 cost to fly to the next venue. According to Dion, $36 was the price his parents paid for monthly rent. He told Holly no. Shortly after midnight, on February 3, 1959, the plane crashed near Clear Lake, Iowa. Holly, Valens, The Big Bopper, and the pilot Roger Peterson were all killed. Bobby Vee, then an unknown artist, performed in Holly's place at the next concert. Later, Jimmy Clanton, Frankie Avalon, and Fabian were hired to finish the tour in place of the three deceased headliners.  As of January 11, 2017, with the death of Holly's tour guitarist Tommy Allsup, Dion is the lone surviving member of the original Winter Dance Party lineup.  (The lone surviving Belmont, Angelo D'Aleo, was not on the tour, as he was in the US Navy at the time.)

In March 1959, Dion and the Belmonts' next single, "A Teenager in Love", broke the Top Ten, reaching No. 5 on the Billboard Hot 100 and No. 28 on the UK Singles Chart. Written by Doc Pomus and Mort Shuman, it's considered one of the greatest songs in rock and roll history. It was followed by their first album, Presenting Dion and the Belmonts. Their biggest hit, "Where or When", was released in November 1959, and reached No. 3 on the Billboard Hot 100 with the group making another national appearance on American Bandstand. Although publicity photos show the group as a trio without Angelo D'Aleo, he performed on all of their recorded material; these photos were presented for promotional reasons owing to his departure to serve in the U.S. Navy.

Other singles released for the group that year continued to chart on Billboard, but were less successful. In early 1960, Dion checked into a hospital for heroin addiction, a problem he had since his mid-teens.  At the height of the group's success his drug dependency worsened.  When "Where or When" peaked, he was in a hospital detoxing. In addition, there were financial and musical differences between Dion and members of the Belmonts. "They wanted to get into their harmony thing, and I wanted to rock and roll," said Dion. "The label wanted me doing standards. I got bored with it quickly. I said, I can't do this. I gotta play my guitar. So we split up and I did 'Runaround Sue', 'The Wanderer' and 'Ruby Baby'."  In October 1960, DiMucci quit for a solo career.  Now simply known as Dion, his first major hit, "Lonely Teenager", was backed by a female chorus. He eventually chose to work with the Del-Satins, who backed him (uncredited) on all his early Laurie and Columbia Records hits, which, besides the three aforementioned hits Dion quoted, also included "Donna the Prima Donna" ,"Drip Drop", "Lovers Who Wander", and "Little Diane".  Later reissues of these songs would often be erroneously attributed to Dion and the Belmonts. The Belmonts also continued to release records on their own label, Sabina Records, but with less success. However, songs like "Such a Long Way", "Tell Me Why", "I Need Someone", "I Confess" and "Come On Little Angel" all received significant radio play in the New York City area.

Dion and the Belmonts reunited in late 1966 for the album Together Again on ABC Records. Produced by DiMont Music, two singles were released from the LP: "My Girl The Month of May" / "Berimbau" and "Movin' Man" / "For Bobbie". Neither charted in the United States, but fared better in England. "My Girl The Month of May" broke the "Radio London Fab 40" Top Ten at No. 9 the week of December 25, 1966. One reviewer stated: "some British radio DJ's gave it a lot of airplay at the time." The follow-up, "Movin Man", reached No. 17 on the "Radio London" chart on March 26, 1967. "My Girl The Month of May" was later covered by English artists Alan Bown in 1967, and by The Bunch (featuring Sandy Denny of Fairport Convention) in April 1972. During their brief mid-1960s reunion, Dion and the Belmonts appeared on The Clay Cole Show performing "Berimbau" and "My Girl The Month of May". They occasionally performed at local New York City nightclubs, such as "The Mardi Gras" on Staten Island (April 29, 1967), before disbanding.

In 1968, as a solo performer, Dion recorded "Abraham, Martin and John", written by Dick Holler. It is a tribute to social change icons Abraham Lincoln, Martin Luther King Jr., John F. Kennedy and Robert F. Kennedy. It was written as a response to the assassination of King in April and the assassination of Robert in June. When producer Phil Gernhard initially presented the song to DiMucci, the latter did not care for it. With the persistence of Gernhard, and Dion's wife Susan, he flew to New York that summer. He recorded the song in just one take. Laurie Records released the single in September of that year and it quickly raced up the chart, peaking at number four in December. DiMucci, now a star again, was invited to sing this comeback hit on The Smothers Brothers Comedy Hour, as well as many other top shows.

The original group reunited once again on June 2, 1972, for a show at Madison Square Garden, which was recorded and released as a live album for Warner Brothers. In 1973, DiMucci, Mastrangelo, Milano and D'Aleo performed once more, doing a sold-out concert at the Nassau Coliseum on Long Island, New York. However, no recording of the 1973 reunion was ever released.

Including Billboard Hot 100 singles, Dion and the Belmonts charted 856 radio station surveys across the United States during the 1950s and 1960s. In 2000, the group was inducted into the Vocal Group Hall of Fame. Dion (without The Belmonts) was inducted into the Rock and Roll Hall of Fame in 1989.

Rock Hall omission
In 2012, the Rock and Roll Hall of Fame did a mass induction of six deserving pioneering groups that were left out in error when their lead singers were inducted in the Hall of Fame's early years of inductions: the Miracles (Smokey Robinson), the Crickets (Buddy Holly), the Midnighters (Hank Ballard), the Famous Flames (James Brown), the Comets (Bill Haley) and the Blue Caps (Gene Vincent) . Because of the timeline when these groups were successful, it was believed that the Belmonts would be included in this induction, but none was forthcoming. Because the Belmonts scored chart hits for an additional three years after Dion left the group, coupled with the fact that the entire group (including Dion) were inducted intact into the Vocal Group Hall of Fame in 2000 (11 years after Dion's solo induction into the Rock Hall), their omission was even more puzzling. In January 2012, the year of that mass vocal group induction, Fred Milano of the Belmonts died (January 1, 2012). A Billboard magazine article dated January 3, 2012 stated: "There was strife between DiMucci and Belmonts members, who were not pleased when DiMucci was inducted into the Rock and Roll Hall of Fame without them in 1989." Carlo Mastrangelo died on April 4, 2016.

Discography

Albums
Dion and the Belmonts released four studio albums and one live album:
 Presenting Dion & The Belmonts (October 1959) Laurie Records
 Wish Upon a Star (June 1960) Laurie/Capitol Records
 By Special Request: Together with the Belmonts (1963)
 Together Again (January 1967) ABC Records
 Reunion: Live at Madison Square Garden (June 2, 1972) Rhino Records (released by Warner Bros. Records in 1973)

The two Laurie Records LPs are the most collectible, especially the first pressings of Presenting Dion & the Belmonts, issued as Laurie LLP-1002 (later reissued as LLP-2002).  There were also later compilation albums, some of which included the separate hits of the Belmonts, and some that included the hits of Dion, and Dion and the Belmonts.

Singles

References

External links

 
 Dion & The Belmonts II
 VIDEO: Induct The Belmonts into The Rock and Roll Hall of Fame with Dion

American vocal groups
Laurie Records artists
Musical groups established in 1957
Musical groups from the Bronx
Doo-wop groups
1957 establishments in New York City